Star Beast is a novel by Will Baker, published by Hodder & Stoughton in 1996.

Plot summary
Star Beast is set in the same post-apocalyptic world of Baker's debut novel Shadow Hunter, in which humans have laid waste to much of the Earth and retreated into huge hive-like cities.

Reception
Gideon Kibblewhite reviewed Star Beast for Arcane magazine, rating it an 8 out of 10 overall. Kibblewhite comments that "the world of the humans is paler and less interesting; so much so that it seems merely a vehicle for the intrigue from which the two heroes must escape. This is a shame, because this is why, for me, the book falls slightly short of its possibilities."

Reviews
Review by Andy Mills (1996) in Vector 188

References

1996 novels